Bente Gunnveig Berg (born 20 February 1954) is a Norwegian neuroscientist and Professor of Neuroscience at the Department of Psychology at the Norwegian University of Science and Technology (NTNU). Her research seeks to understand how the brain processes olfactory information, including how signals are encoded in a functional neural network. She is a member of the Royal Norwegian Society of Sciences and Letters.

References

Living people
1954 births
Norwegian neuroscientists
Academic staff of the Norwegian University of Science and Technology
Royal Norwegian Society of Sciences and Letters